USS Arcturus (SP-182) was a yacht acquired by the U.S. Navy during World War I. She was reconfigured by the Navy as an armed patrol craft, and was assigned to patrol the waterways of New York City.

Yacht built in New York 

Arcturus (SP-182)—a wooden-hulled yacht built in 1911 by the Gas Engine & Power Co. and the Charles L. Seabury Co., Morris Heights, New York City—was purchased by the Navy from Martin L. Quinn of New York City on 25 May 1917; and placed in commission on 18 August 1917.

World War I service 
 
For her whole career, Arcturus was assigned to the section patrol duty in the 3d Naval District, headquartered at New York City.

Post-war decommissioning 

She was decommissioned on 7 May 1919 and sold on 4 October 1919 to Reinhard Hall, Brooklyn, New York.

References 
 
 USS Arcturus (SP-182), 1917–1919. Later renamed SP-182. Originally the Civilian Motor Boat Arcturus (1911)
 NavSource Online: SP-182 – ex-Arcturus (SP 182)

World War I patrol vessels of the United States
Ships built in Morris Heights, Bronx
1911 ships
Individual yachts